Anhar may refer to:

Places in Iran
 Anhar-e Olya
 Anhar-e Sofla
 Anhar, a village to the northwest of Urmia

Religion
 Anhar, the wife of John the Baptist in Mandaeism